Grant Bond is a comic book artist, writer and award-winning editorial cartoonist living in Kansas City, Kansas.

Biography

Grant Bond was born and raised in Kansas City, Kansas. His love for art was a fixture of his youth and early adult life due to the support and influence of his grandmother. He studied under Russian painter Sergei Davydov (artist) for many years.  Bond has credited comic creator Ande Parks for personally sparking an early interest in creating comics. He left the creative world behind to successfully manage a business for most of the 1990s. In late 2006 he returned to comics with his first book Revere: Revolution in Silver originally published with Alias Enterprises. As a relative newcomer to comics, Bond's animation-influenced art style has already amassed a heavy fan base.

In 2006 Bond illustrated The Clockwork Girl comic book now being adapted into the 2014 animated feature film The Clockwork Girl (film). In 2007 he illustrated a comic book adaptation of the 2009 movie Trick 'r Treat, which was published by DC/Wildstorm.

Partial bibliography

Creature Academy (Frogchildren Studios, 2013)
Tron: Uprising (Disney)
Supernatural (U.S. TV series): Caledonia (DC Comics, 2011)
Assassin's Creed Ascendance (Ubisoft, 2010)
Megamind (DC/Wildstorm, 2010)
American McGee's Grimm Adaptation (IDW Publishing, 2009)
Igor (film) Movie Prequel  (IDW Publishing, 2008)
Archibald Saves Christmas (Shadowline, 2007)
Trick 'r Treat (DC/Wildstorm, 2007)
Revere: Revolution in Silver Hardcover (ASP Comics, 2007)(Released 7/28/07)
Gene Simmons House of Horrors Anthology (IDW Publishing, 2007)
Clockwork Girl (Arcana Studio, 2007) (HarperCollins, 2011)
Revere: Revolution in Silver (Alias Enterprises, 2006)

Film
 Grant Bond was an uncredited extra in the 1989 movie No Holds Barred starring professional wrestler Hulk Hogan.

References

External links
Grant Bond's official site 
Grant Bond: Comic Book Database entry

1974 births
Living people
Writers from Kansas City, Kansas
American comics artists
American comics writers